13th Combat Service Support Battalion (13 CSSB) is a unit of the 13th Brigade of the Australian Army Reserve. Located in Western Australia, it is the logistics component of the 13th Brigade.

History
The battalion was formed in March 1995 and was previously designated the 13th Brigade Administrative Support Battalion. On formation, it consisted of the following sub-units:

 7th Field Ambulance 
 10th Transport Squadron 
 13th Field Supply Company 
 5th Dental Unit 
 113th Field Workshop Company

13 CSSB was granted "Freedom of Entry" to the City of Fremantle on 1 October 2001. Its motto is ″Soldiers Supporting Soldiers″.

Role and composition
The role of 13 CSSB is to provide service and logistics support to the 13th Brigade and wider Australian Army. A Reserve unit, it is based at Irwin Barracks, and as of February 2020, 13 CSSB comprises a battalion headquarters and four sub-units:
 7th Close Health Company
 10th Transport Squadron 
 113th Workshop Company
 13 CSSB Logistics Company

References

Combat service support battalions of the Australian Army
Military units and formations established in 1995

Military Units in Western Australia